The Admiralteysky constituency (No.206) was a Russian legislative constituency in the Saint Petersburg in 1995–2007. It covered parts of central Saint Petersburg, including Admiralteysky District, Vasileostrovsky District and parts of Kirovsky District. Currently most of the former Admiralteysky constituency is part of Central constituency, while Kirovsky District portion was put into Southern constituency.

Members elected

Election results

1995

|-
! colspan=2 style="background-color:#E9E9E9;text-align:left;vertical-align:top;" |Candidate
! style="background-color:#E9E9E9;text-align:left;vertical-align:top;" |Party
! style="background-color:#E9E9E9;text-align:right;" |Votes
! style="background-color:#E9E9E9;text-align:right;" |%
|-
|style="background-color:#3A46CE"|
|align=left|Yuly Rybakov
|align=left|Democratic Choice of Russia – United Democrats
|
|26.90%
|-
|style="background-color:"|
|align=left|Nikolay Ivanov
|align=left|Independent
|
|20.42%
|-
|style="background-color:#D50000"|
|align=left|Anatoly Potapov
|align=left|Communists and Working Russia - for the Soviet Union
|
|8.66%
|-
|style="background-color:"|
|align=left|Yury Savelyev
|align=left|Independent
|
|4.05%
|-
|style="background-color:#3C3E42"|
|align=left|Anatoly Smirnov
|align=left|Duma-96
|
|3.27%
|-
|style="background-color:#2C299A"|
|align=left|Bagatyr Kaparov
|align=left|Congress of Russian Communities
|
|2.89%
|-
|style="background-color:#959698"|
|align=left|Vyacheslav Marychev
|align=left|Derzhava
|
|2.52%
|-
|style="background-color:"|
|align=left|Kirill Sadchikov
|align=left|Liberal Democratic Party
|
|2.35%
|-
|style="background-color:"|
|align=left|Anatoly Butov
|align=left|Political Movement of Transport Workers
|
|2.09%
|-
|style="background-color:"|
|align=left|Stepan Zholovan
|align=left|Independent
|
|2.07%
|-
|style="background-color:#1C1A0D"|
|align=left|Vladimir Zhavoronkov
|align=left|Forward, Russia!
|
|1.89%
|-
|style="background-color:#019CDC"|
|align=left|Aleksandr Uskov
|align=left|Party of Russian Unity and Accord
|
|1.68%
|-
|style="background-color:"|
|align=left|Vasily Chernyshev
|align=left|Independent
|
|1.57%
|-
|style="background-color:"|
|align=left|Vladimir Bentsianov
|align=left|Independent
|
|1.44%
|-
|style="background-color:#192082"|
|align=left|Andrey Grinbergas
|align=left|Frontier Generation
|
|0.98%
|-
|style="background-color:#DD137B"|
|align=left|Oleg Gapanovich
|align=left|Social Democrats
|
|0.79%
|-
|style="background-color:"|
|align=left|Viktor Bryzgalin
|align=left|Independent
|
|0.75%
|-
|style="background-color:#000000"|
|colspan=2 |against all
|
|13.01%
|-
| colspan="5" style="background-color:#E9E9E9;"|
|- style="font-weight:bold"
| colspan="3" style="text-align:left;" | Total
| 
| 100%
|-
| colspan="5" style="background-color:#E9E9E9;"|
|- style="font-weight:bold"
| colspan="4" |Source:
|
|}

1999

|-
! colspan=2 style="background-color:#E9E9E9;text-align:left;vertical-align:top;" |Candidate
! style="background-color:#E9E9E9;text-align:left;vertical-align:top;" |Party
! style="background-color:#E9E9E9;text-align:right;" |Votes
! style="background-color:#E9E9E9;text-align:right;" |%
|-
|style="background-color:#1042A5"|
|align=left|Yuly Rybakov (incumbent)
|align=left|Union of Right Forces
|
|21.20%
|-
|style="background-color:#7C273A"|
|align=left|Yury Savelyev
|align=left|Movement in Support of the Army
|
|12.20%
|-
|style="background-color:"|
|align=left|Vitaly Shtager
|align=left|Yabloko
|
|10.66%
|-
|style="background-color:"|
|align=left|Aleksandr Nevzorov
|align=left|Independent
|
|10.27%
|-
|style="background-color:#3B9EDF"|
|align=left|Valery Mikheyev
|align=left|Fatherland – All Russia
|
|9.37%
|-
|style="background-color:#C21022"|
|align=left|Gennady Zhirnov
|align=left|Party of Pensioners
|
|8.17%
|-
|style="background-color:#FCCA19"|
|align=left|Valentin Zanin
|align=left|Congress of Russian Communities-Yury Boldyrev Movement
|
|4.50%
|-
|style="background-color:"|
|align=left|Sergey Tsyplyayev
|align=left|Independent
|
|4.10%
|-
|style="background-color:"|
|align=left|Aleksandr Butenko
|align=left|Independent
|
|2.74%
|-
|style="background-color:"|
|align=left|Gennady Zolotrubov
|align=left|Independent
|
|1.65%
|-
|style="background-color:#020266"|
|align=left|Andrey Malakhin
|align=left|Russian Socialist Party
|
|0.78%
|-
|style="background-color:"|
|align=left|Vladimir Bashmachnikov
|align=left|Our Home – Russia
|
|0.60%
|-
|style="background-color:"|
|align=left|Anatoly Doniyakh
|align=left|Independent
|
|0.58%
|-
|style="background-color:#000000"|
|colspan=2 |against all
|
|12.15%
|-
| colspan="5" style="background-color:#E9E9E9;"|
|- style="font-weight:bold"
| colspan="3" style="text-align:left;" | Total
| 
| 100%
|-
| colspan="5" style="background-color:#E9E9E9;"|
|- style="font-weight:bold"
| colspan="4" |Source:
|
|}

2003

|-
! colspan=2 style="background-color:#E9E9E9;text-align:left;vertical-align:top;" |Candidate
! style="background-color:#E9E9E9;text-align:left;vertical-align:top;" |Party
! style="background-color:#E9E9E9;text-align:right;" |Votes
! style="background-color:#E9E9E9;text-align:right;" |%
|-
|style="background-color:"|
|align=left|Andrey Benin
|align=left|Independent
|
|17.46%
|-
|style="background-color:"|
|align=left|Yuly Rybakov (incumbent)
|align=left|Independent
|
|16.77%
|-
|style="background-color:"|
|align=left|Sergey Andreyev
|align=left|Independent
|
|10.91%
|-
|style="background-color:"|
|align=left|Yury Savelyev
|align=left|Rodina
|
|10.35%
|-
|style="background-color:#1042A5"|
|align=left|Aleksey Titov
|align=left|Union of Right Forces
|
|5.53%
|-
|style="background-color:"|
|align=left|Vladimir Yudin
|align=left|Independent
|
|4.39%
|-
|style="background-color:#FFD700"|
|align=left|Vitaly Kalinin
|align=left|People's Party
|
|3.74%
|-
|style="background-color:"|
|align=left|Aleksandr Belyayev
|align=left|Liberal Democratic Party
|
|3.35%
|-
|style="background-color:#D50000"|
|align=left|Dmitry Kuzmin
|align=left|Russian Communist Workers Party-Russian Party of Communists
|
|3.27%
|-
|style="background-color:"|
|align=left|Milania Ausheva
|align=left|Independent
|
|2.34%
|-
|style="background-color:"|
|align=left|Yury Sevenard
|align=left|Independent
|
|2.25%
|-
|style="background-color:#00A1FF"|
|align=left|Mikhail Zlydnikov
|align=left|Party of Russia's Rebirth-Russian Party of Life
|
|1.72%
|-
|style="background-color:"|
|align=left|Ivan Zakharov
|align=left|Independent
|
|0.90%
|-
|style="background-color:"|
|align=left|Valentin Mettus
|align=left|Independent
|
|0.90%
|-
|style="background-color:"|
|align=left|Mikhail Maystrenko
|align=left|Independent
|
|0.64%
|-
|style="background-color:#164C8C"|
|align=left|Valentin Korovin
|align=left|United Russian Party Rus'
|
|0.64%
|-
|style="background-color:"|
|align=left|Anatoly Danolchenko
|align=left|Independent
|
|0.12%
|-
|style="background-color:#000000"|
|colspan=2 |against all
|
|13.79%
|-
| colspan="5" style="background-color:#E9E9E9;"|
|- style="font-weight:bold"
| colspan="3" style="text-align:left;" | Total
| 
| 100%
|-
| colspan="5" style="background-color:#E9E9E9;"|
|- style="font-weight:bold"
| colspan="4" |Source:
|
|}

References

Obsolete Russian legislative constituencies
Politics of Saint Petersburg